James Johnstone may refer to:

James Johnstone, 1st Earl of Hartfell (1602–1653), Scottish peer and royalist
James Johnstone, 2nd Marquess of Annandale (c. 1687–1730), Scottish peer
Sir James Johnstone, 3rd Baronet (1697–1772), Scottish MP for Dumfries Burghs 1743–1754
Sir James Johnstone, 4th Baronet (1726–1794), Scottish MP for Dumfries Burghs 1784–1790 and Weymouth & Melcombe Regis
James Johnstone (explorer) (1759–1823), master, later lieutenant, aboard HMS Chatham during George Vancouver's 1791–95 expedition
James Hope-Johnstone, 3rd Earl of Hopetoun (1741–1816), Scottish representative peer and Lord Lieutenant of Linlithgowshire
Chevalier de Johnstone (1719–c. 1791), actually James Johnstone, Jacobite army officer
James Johnstone (1801–1888), Scottish MP for Clackmannanshire & Kinross-shire
James Johnstone (publisher) (1815–1878), British newspaper proprietor
James Johnstone (biologist) (1870–1932), British biologist and oceanographer
James Johnstone (stock breeder) (1859–1933), New Zealand businessman and stock breeder
Jim Johnstone (poet) (born 1978), Canadian physiologist and poet
Jim Johnstone (umpire) (1872–1927), American baseball umpire
Jim Johnstone (basketball) (born 1960), American basketball player
Jimmy Johnstone (1944–2006), Scottish footballer
James Johnstone (rugby union) (born 1990), Scottish rugby union player

See also
James Johnston (disambiguation)
James Johnson (disambiguation)